Aithne Rowse (born 1968?) is an anaesthetist who was the first South African woman to over-winter in Antarctica.

Biography 
Rowse grew up in Johannesburg and studied for a degree at Wits University Medical School. She worked at Johannesburg Hospital and as an anaesthetist at Chris Hani Baragwanath Hospital in Diepkloof. She has recommended better practice in tourniquet technique.

Antarctica 
In 1979, American Michele Eileen Raney was the first woman doctor to be in Antarctica all year when she spent the winter at the South Pole.
Rowse was the first South African woman to over-winter in Antarctica in 1997 when she was aged 29. She was also the first woman to be selected to join any SANAE team. She was part of a team of ten who were the first group to spend the winter on the South African base SANAE IV. Rowse was doctor for the team and her preparation for the job meant that she undertook a range of courses to make her familiar with every aspect of emergency medicine. Prior to arrival, Rowse had not met any of the members of the team for that year. Afterwards, Rowse married fellow team member Hein de Beer.

References 

Female polar explorers
Living people
Year of birth missing (living people)
South African women physicians
20th-century South African physicians
20th-century women physicians
21st-century women physicians
South African anaesthetists
South African explorers
University of the Witwatersrand alumni
Women anesthesiologists
21st-century South African physicians